Nanchang Metro Line 3 is the third line to open in the Nanchang Metro rapid transit system. It opened on 26 December 2020.

Opening timeline

Map

Stations

References

03
Railway lines opened in 2020